Victory roll may refer to:

A pin in professional wrestling
Aileron roll, an aerobatic maneuver
Victory roll (hairstyle), a women's hairstyle